Automolis subulva is a species of moth of the family Erebidae. It was described by Paul Mabille in 1884. It is found in Cameroon, Equatorial Guinea, Ghana and Mali.

References

Syntomini
Moths described in 1884
Erebid moths of Africa